Lucky Ducky is a 1948 American animated cartoon from Metro-Goldwyn-Mayer. It was directed by Tex Avery, animated by Walt Clinton (here credited as Walter Clinton), Preston Blair, Louie Schmitt, and Grant Simmons, with musical direction by Scott Bradley.

This short was originally in development as a George and Junior entry, but was ultimately produced with two random dog characters instead of the two bears, who might share the same names as them.

Plot 
The foreword of the cartoon tells:

Dedicated
to those duck hunters
who leave at dawn
with loaded gun...
and come home late loaded...

Many ducks are swimming and flying around a pond. They are also doing a conga line around two dogs who were meant to be the two bears, George and Junior, but are now dogs, then are hunting, waiting in their boat, probably they're meant to share the same names as the two bears. Nearby at a tree, a sign reads "No Hunting Before 6:AM.  As the clock finally strikes six, all the ducks fly away before George and Junior have the chance to shoot one. Then George and Junior spot a mother duck having her nest with an egg in it strapped to herself. George and Junior fire, but miss the shot, then watch as the strap breaks, dropping the egg onto the boat and hatching. Just then, a small duckling appears, starts dancing and taking off the egg shell, and jumps into the water. George and Junior point their guns into the water, but hear that no shooting is heard. George and Junior lift their guns, revealing that the duckling had tied the point of their guns together in a knot. The duckling laughs and jumps back into the water. The duckling goes under the boat and pulls out a drill and puts a hole in the boat. George and Junior notice the leaking, and as George covers the hole with his hands, water starts coming out of his ears, but are stopped by Junior, who covers George's with his hands. Suddenly, water starts coming out of George's ears, and is stopped by George, who stops the water by using Junior's nose like a faucet. George uncovers the hole, and the duckling honks his nose, laughs, and dives back in. George points his gun into the hole, and tries to shoot the duckling, but fails when the duckling snaps it shut with a clip. George pulls up his gun, but as Junior lets go of the clip, the gun explodes in George's face. The duckling then lifts the boat and hits it against the water. The duckling laughs and swims away.

George then heads to the motor, and tries to start the engine, but fails when it has problems trying to start start. Junior lifts the anchor and uses George's head to start the boat. As George and Junior chase the duckling at super-sonic speed, the boat's rudder blades cut the water in half, then the land in half, sinking a tree. Continuing the chase in the boat on dry land, the blades proceed to turn a log, two trees and a rock mountain into a bridge, staircase and ladder, and Mount Rushmore, respectively. The duckling and the boat go into a hole in a tree and go through another tree that has a hole. The duckling passes between two trees with the big tree suddenly lifting the small tree before the boat can do something to it. After crossing a mudpit and squeezing between two other trees, the chase temporarily ends with the boat and everybody crashing into a rock and getting flattened. Now chasing the duckling on foot, they stop upon a "Stop School Crossing" sign with an actual schoolhouse crossing the road. Chasing the duckling into a forest, everything suddenly turns black and white, the trio having passed a sign indicating "Technicolor Ends Here" where they go to have a look at it to read it. Going back into the color portion of the forest, the duckling stops at the edge of a cliff and spots Junior coming toward him and screams, prompting the duckling to pull out a bottle of "Quick Grow" and instantly turning a small plant into a tree which Junior crashes into. Junior then grabs an ax, and then puts it down to spit on his hands. George comes back, and Junior blindly uses him instead of the ax. Junior notices this, and puts George down. Then George spits out a little pile of logs.

Back at the pond, Junior is sniffing out the scent of the duckling who dumps pepper into Junior's nose and places a pie in his hands. Junior sneeze blows the pie out of his hands and all over George's, the whipped cream and cherry filling looking like an outfit of Santa Claus.

The duckling jumps into a hole in a log. Junior then reaches his hand into the log, but fails to catch the duckling, who makes a slingshot, slinging Junior's hand into his head. George then points his gun toward the hole, but fails to catch the duckling, who pulls out a frightening mask, scaring and shrinking the gun, which screams and fires a shot and lets out some bullets. Junior grabs George's gun, and tries to shoot the duckling, but fails when it doesn't shoot. Junior pulls out the bullet and hands it to George, who gets shot in the face, leaving him in blackface. George hands Junior the bullet, which gets him left in blackface.

Next, the duckling leaves his footprints in the ground. George and Junior's guns point to where the duckling is: in three different paths. George then gets out a duck call, and blows to call for the duckling, but is shocked when the duckling answers back with a smaller duck call. The chase on water resumes by George and Junior in their repaired boat. The duckling suddenly stops, and just as George and Junior are about to shoot, the duckling pulls out a STOP sign and points to the clock from the beginning which now has a sign showing "NO SHOOTING AFTER 5:00 PM". The bell rings, much to George and Junior's horror, but as they both scream in terror, the ducks come back, swimming, flying and doing another conga line, while the disgruntled George and Junior sit angry that they didn't even shoot one single duck. Meanwhile, on the boat, the duckling has now joined the conga line as the camera irises out on him.

References

External links 
 

1948 animated films
1948 short films
1948 films
1948 comedy films
Metro-Goldwyn-Mayer short films
Films directed by Tex Avery
American black-and-white films
American animated short films
1940s American animated films
1940s animated short films
Metro-Goldwyn-Mayer films
Films scored by Scott Bradley
Films about hunters
Self-reflexive films
Films produced by Fred Quimby
Animated films about dogs
Animated films about ducks
Films set in forests
Films partially in color
Metro-Goldwyn-Mayer cartoon studio short films
1940s English-language films